Kalin is a famous mythological hero in the Hindu religious text Rigveda, written in verse. 

Characters in Hindu mythology